Coenraadt "Coen" Moulijn (15 February 1937 – 4 January 2011) was a Dutch footballer who played for Feyenoord from 1955 to 1972 and was part of their European Cup victory in 1970.

Club career
Compared to Stanley Matthews and Garrincha, Moulijn was considered one of the most talented leftwingers in Dutch football history. Johan Cruyff added him to his alltime favorite Dutch national team, stating that "Coen mastered one movement better than anyone: threatening to pass his opponent through the center, and then speeding past him on the other side. He was an exceptionally talented football player. A typical product of the Dutch school."

Hans Kraay was a tough defender in Feyenoord in those days. "Coen was unique. Coaches tried to tell him how to play but he’d shrug and do his own thing. Like Messi. He played on intuition. His move to the inside was unique. He was able to make the opponent stand stiff like a puppet and he’d race past him. He didn’t look like much though. When I saw him first up close I didn’t even recognize him. He looked like an accountant."

Rinus Israël: "He was a modest, hardworking man. I think the fans loved him because of that too. Whenever Coen would have ball possession, people would get religious experiences. I think he was the best Feyenoord player ever."

Wim Jansen: "Coen was tremendous. I dare to say that in pure football skills he was as good as Johan Cruyff. Johan was a leader and would impact the whole team, whereas Coen was an individual player, but man oh man, was he good."

Moulijn played in the 1950s to the 1970s as left winger for the Rotterdam club Feyenoord. He starred when the team won both the European Cup and the Intercontinental Cup in 1970. He earned 38 caps and scored 4 goals for the Netherlands national football team.

Personal life

On 28 July 1961, Moulijn married Lenie Waterreus. He was struck by a cerebral infarction on New Years Day 2011 and died three days later.

As a child, he lived on the same street (Bloklandstraat) as Feyenoord teammate Wim Jansen.

References

External links

 Obituary – Feyenoord
 Feyenoord mourn Moulijn-By Berend Scholten on UEFA.com
 
 Ancestors Coen Moulijn

1937 births
2011 deaths
Association football wingers
Footballers from Rotterdam
Dutch footballers
Netherlands international footballers
XerxesDZB players
Feyenoord players
Eredivisie players
Knights of the Order of Orange-Nassau
UEFA Champions League winning players